CB&I is a large engineering, procurement and construction (EPC) company with its administrative headquarters in The Woodlands, Texas. CB&I specializes in projects for oil and gas companies. CB&I employs more than 32,000 people worldwide. In May 2018 the company merged into McDermott International. McDermott struggled to integrate its acquisition of Chicago Bridge & Iron Co. On January 21, 2020, McDermott announced that it had filed for Chapter 11 bankruptcy due to asbestos litigation. A $22.5 million trust fund was made to handle asbestos claims.

History 

CB&I was founded in 1889 by Horace E. Horton in Chicago, Illinois, USA. While initially involved in bridge design and construction, CB&I turned its focus to bulk liquid storage in the late 19th and early 20th centuries, coinciding with the western expansion of railroads across the United States and the discovery of oil in the Southwest. CB&I quickly became known for design engineering and field construction of elevated water storage tanks, above-ground tanks for storage of petroleum and refined products, refinery process vessels and other steel plate structures. As such, CB&I supported the expansion of oil exploration outside the US, starting operations in South America in 1924, in Asia two years later and in the Middle East in 1939.

According to one of the founder's heirs, "The old joke is that Chicago Bridge & Iron isn't in Chicago, doesn't build bridges and doesn't use iron."

During World War II, CB&I was selected to build Landing Ship Tanks (LSTs), which carried troops and supplies to American and Allied troops fighting in Europe and the Pacific theater. CB&I was chosen because of their reputation and skills, particularly welding. Since the coastal shipyards were busy building large vessels for the war effort, such as aircraft carriers, battleships, cruisers and destroyers, there was no alternative but to use the inland waterways and shipyards for the production of smaller ships. As a result of these and other wartime production activities, CB&I ranked 92nd among US corporations in the value of World War II military production contracts.

CB&I was acquired by Praxair in 1996; Praxair kept a chemical subsidiary and spun off CB&I as a Dutch-incorporated company the next year. CB&I headquarters moved from Chicago to Houston, Texas in 2001 and then to the Hague, Netherlands when Texas enacted a franchise tax.

2000-present

In 2003 it bought John Brown Hydrocarbons, renaming it at first CB&I John Brown, and later CB&I UK Limited.

The firm acquired Lummus Global from ABB on November 19, 2007, adding approximately 3,000 employees. In 2012, CB&I Technology (formerly Lummus) was awarded a contract by Indian petrochemicals major, Reliance Industries, to provide paraxylene (P-Xylene) (PX) technology for an aromatics complex in India. The complex was started up in April 2017, making Reliance the world's second largest producer of paraxylene.

In 2012, CB&I agreed to buy The Shaw Group for about US$3 billion, completing the acquisition in February 2013. The subsidiary that was formed as a result, CB&I Stone Webster—a result of The Shaw Group's earlier acquisition of Stone & Webster during its bankruptcy—was again sold, in January 2016, to Westinghouse Electric Co., for US$229M.

For 2017, revenue for CBI was $6.7 billion, down from the year before.

In May 2018 the company was acquired by McDermott International for US$6 billion. After being acquired by McDermott, CB&I's stock ceased being listed on the NYSE on May 11, 2018. Gary P. Luquette was the chairman of the combined company. McDermott struggled to integrate its acquisition of Chicago Bridge & Iron Co, and in January 2020 was facing bankruptcy. On January 21, 2020, McDermott announced that it had filed for Chapter 11 bankruptcy.

Operations 
In July 2017, CB&I's global business groups were:
Technology: licensed process technologies, catalysts, specialized equipment and engineered products for use in petrochemical facilities, oil refineries and gas processing plants;
Engineering & Construction: engineering, procurement, fabrication and construction of major energy infrastructure facilities;
Fabrication Services: fabrication capabilities for piping, structural steel, module prefabrication and assembly, as well as storage tanks and vessels for the oil and gas, water and wastewater, mining and power generation industries

Corporate headquarters were located in The Hague, Netherlands. The administrative headquarters were located in The Woodlands, Texas. In 2018 McDermott announced that it would sell the headquarters facility in The Woodlands to Howard Hughes Corporation.

Major projects

Historic structures
The company built bridges and other works of historic importance, including some listed on the US National Register of Historic Places.  These works include (with varying attribution):

Boiling Nuclear Superheater (BONUS) Reactor Facility, Punta Higuero Sector, PR 413, Rincon, Puerto Rico (Chicago Bridge Co. Nuclear Engineering), NRHP-listed
Bunnell Water Tower, 100 Utility Street, Bunnell, FL 32110, Bunnell, Florida (Chicago Bridge & Iron Co.), NRHP-listed
One or more works in the Caplinger Mills Historic District, junction of Washington Ave. and the Sac River, Caplinger Mills, Missouri (Chicago Bridge Co.), NRHP-listed
Embarras River Bridge, Wade Township Rd. 164 over Embarras River, Newton, Illinois (Chicago Bridge Co.), NRHP-listed
Evansville Standpipe, 288 N. 4th St., Evansville, Wisconsin (Chicago Bridge & Iron Co.), NRHP-listed
Hartford Water Tower, Pine & 1st. Sts., Hartford, Arkansas (Chicago Bridge & Iron Co.), NRHP-listed 
Hughes Water Tower, Church St., Hughes, Arkansas (Chicago Bridge & Iron Works Co.), NRHP-listed
Lake Ditch Bridge, junction of Lake Ditch and Lake Ditch Rd., Monrovia, Indiana (Chicago Bridge and Iron Co.), NRHP-listed
Mahned Bridge, Mahned Rd. over the Leaf River, New Augusta, Mississippi (Chicago Bridge and Iron Company), NRHP-listed
Manning Water Tower, 620 3rd St., Manning, Iowa (Chicago Bridge and Iron Co.), NRHP-listed
McCrory Waterworks, junction of N. Fakes and W. Third, McCrory, Arkansas (Chicago Bridge & Iron Works), NRHP-listed
Mill Race Bridge, Pheasant Rd. over Turkey River, West Union, Iowa (Chicago Bridge and Iron Co.), NRHP-listed
Monette Water Tower, SW. corner junction of AR 139 & Texie Ave., Monette, Arkansas (Chicago Bridge & Iron), NRHP-listed
Otranto Bridge, 480th Ave. over Big Cedar River, St. Ansgar, Iowa (Chicago Bridge and Iron Company), NRHP-listed
Tyronza Water Tower, NW of junction of Main St. and Oliver St., Tyronza, Arkansas (Chicago Bridge & Iron Works), NRHP-listed
Water Street/Darden Road Bridge, Over St. Joseph River at Darden Rd., South Bend, Indiana (Chicago Bridge & Iron Co.), NRHP-listed
West Water Tower and Ground Storage Tank, 310 11th Ave., Orion, Illinois (Chicago Bridge & Iron), NRHP-listed

World War II

There was a great demand for ships and U.S. Navy vessels during World War II. For the war Chicago Bridge built in its Eureka, California shipyard Medium Auxiliary Floating Dry Docks ( or AFDM). These could repair ships in remote locations and could be move to more needed actions during the war. Chicago Bridge also had shipyards in: Seneca, Illinois, Newburgh, New York and Morgan City, Louisiana.
 AFDB-5 (A-G), scrapped in 1997
USS Los Alamos (AFDB-7) (A-G), sold to private shipyard in 1995
   USS Richland (AFDM-8), later called YFD 64, scrapped in 2016
    USS AFDM-9, also called YFD 65, sold to private use in 1989
    USS Resolute (AFDM-10), also called YFD 67, destroyed in 1947
    USS AFDM-11, also called YFD 68, sold to private use in 2004
 Six floating crane barges
    USS AFDM-1 YFD 3, was floated through the Panama Canal on its side, and scrapped in 1986
    USS AFDM-3 through the Panama Canal on its side, YFD 6, sold to private use 
    USS AFDM-4  YFD 10 sold to private use in 1948
    USS Endeavor AFD-1 – AFDL-1 
    USS AFD-2 
    USS AFD-3 – AFDL-3 
    USS AFD-4 – AFDL-4 
    USS AFD-5 – AFDL-5 
    USS Dynamic (AFD-6) – AFDL-6 
    USS Ability (AFD-7)
    USS AFD-8 – AFDL-8 
    USS AFD-9 – AFDL-9 
    USS AFD-10 – AFDL-10 
    USS AFD-11 – AFDL-11 

LST
Built: LST-197 to LST-136; LST-511 to LST-522; LST-600 to LST-652; LST-777 to LST-774; and LST-1115 to LST-1152.
 Barges: YFN-611, YFN-612, and YFN-613
 Floating  derrick cranes: YD-120 and YD-121
 Tank barge: DPC-408 to DPC-419, to transport liquids.

Other projects

Other major projects include:

 LNG liquefaction plant in Pampa Melchorita, Peru;

 Natural gas processing and treating complex in Cabinda Province, Angola;
 Crude vacuum and decoking unit expansion project for a refinery in Kansas, US;
 Golden Pass LNG import terminal near Sabine Pass, Texas, US;
 Large tankage facility at Shell Pearl GTL, Qatar;
 Hydrotreating and sulfur removal/recovery facilities for several major US refiners;
 A $775 million LNG re-gasification terminal at Quintero Bay, Chile;  
 Cat gas hydrotreater (CGHT) in El Paso, Texas, US;
 Hydrogen generation plant in Benicia, California, US;
 Propane dehydrogenation unit in Houston, Texas, US;
 Multiple Middle East storage facilities; and
 Oil sands storage tanks in Alberta, Canada.
 150 wind turbine towers for wind farms in the western United States (2004).
 Petrochemicals expansion project in Geismar, Louisiana, including the license and basic engineering for ethylene technology (2012).

Controversy
CB&I was revealed as a subscriber to the UK's Consulting Association, exposed in 2009 for operating an illegal construction industry blacklist; CB&I was one of 14 companies issued with enforcement notices by the UK Information Commissioner's Office. A CB&I employee consulted the blacklist more than 900 times in 2007 alone, a 2010 employment tribunal was told.

Chicago Bridge & Iron Beaumont

Chicago Bridge & Iron Beaumont was a yard owned by Chicago Bridge & Iron Company from 1982 to 2017 in Beaumont, Texas. Chicago Bridge & Iron Company Beaumont closed the Beaumont work yard, called Beaumont Island Park Fabrication Services, in 2017 after the site was flooded due to Hurricane Harvey in September 2017. In 2008 Chicago Bridge & Iron Company sold the site to Port of Beaumont. Port of Beaumont entered into a partnership with Allegiant Industrial Island Park to rebuild the 75 acres site. Allegiant Industrial opened the Allegiant Industrial Island Park Campus on the site in October 2018. The site has 500,000 square feet of welding and fabrication space.

References

External links
	

Companies listed on the New York Stock Exchange
Construction and civil engineering companies of the United States
History of Chicago
Bridge companies
1997 initial public offerings
1996 mergers and acquisitions
2018 mergers and acquisitions
Companies based in The Woodlands, Texas
Construction and civil engineering companies established in 1889
American companies established in 1889
1889 establishments in Illinois